Lawrenceville Historic District is a national historic district located at Lawrenceville, Brunswick County, Virginia. It encompasses 326 contributing buildings, 1 contributing site, 3 contributing structures, and 1 contributing object in the central business district and surrounding residential areas of Lawrenceville. Notable buildings include Saint Andrew's Episcopal Church (1829), Lawrenceville Methodist Church, and Lawrenceville Baptist Church (1901). Located in the district and separately listed are the Brunswick County Courthouse Square and Saint Paul's College.

It was listed on the National Register of Historic Places in 2000.

References

Historic districts on the National Register of Historic Places in Virginia
Buildings and structures in Brunswick County, Virginia
National Register of Historic Places in Brunswick County, Virginia